The Supercopa de España is a Spanish futsal championship contested by the winners of the División de Honor and the Copa de España.

Winners

Wins by club

Notes

External links
Liga Nacional de Futbol Sala Official Website

Supercup
Spain